The Western Arkansas League was a short–lived minor league baseball league that played in the 1924 season. The six–team Independent league consisted of franchises based exclusively in Arkansas. The league permanently folded after one season of minor league play.

History
The Western Arkansas League played in the 1924 season as a non–signatory, Independent level league, with E.H. Nichols serving as league president. Teams from Atkins, Arkansas, Clarksville, Arkansas, Dardanelle, Arkansas, Ozark, Arkansas, Paris, Arkansas and Russellville, Arkansas were the charter members.

The league was formed at a time when only two cities in Arkansas (Little Rock and Fort Smith) hosted minor league teams. Ozark was the final team to commit to playing in the six–team Western Arkansas League. The league was scheduled to play 60 games in a split–season format, with the winner of each split–season meeting in the finals to decide the champion. League president E.H. Nichols published a letter in the newspaper of each host city, asking for good sportsmanship.

The Western Arkansas League applied to the National Association for Class D level status. The request was denied, with the National Association stating the league cities were too small. Team rosters were set at 12 players, including the managers, with payroll capped at $1,000. 

The league began play on May 5, 1924, and completed the split–season schedule. The Dardanelle White Sox won the first–half title, winning a playoff against Russellville after a tie. Russellville won the second–half title. An August 12, 1924 Atkins win over Russellville was reversed due to an ineligible player, giving the second–half title to Russellville. Originally, Russellville, Atkins and Clarksville had ended in a three–way tie for 1st place. In the Finals, Russellville swept Dardanelle 3 games to 0 to win the championship.

On August 3, 1924, "Jacoway" pitched a perfect game for Dardanelle against Atkins.

League teams

League standings 
First–half standings
 
Second–half standings

Playoffs - Dardanelle White Sox 3 games Russellville 0 - For first half title.
Finals - Russellville 3 games Dardanelle White Sox 0.

References

Defunct minor baseball leagues in the United States
Baseball leagues in Arkansas
Defunct professional sports leagues in the United States
Sports leagues established in 1924
Sports leagues disestablished in 1924